Sébastien Ruster (born September 6, 1982 in Marseille) is a French professional football player. Currently, he plays in the Championnat de France amateur for US Le Pontet.

Ruster started his career with AS Cannes and was released after Cannes lost their professional status. Ruster then joined Swindon Town F.C. in the Football League Second Division. Town released Ruster after Cannes demanded compensation for Ruster's transfer. FIFA agreed with Cannes, but Swindon successfully overturned the initial ruling of 345,000 Euros for the transfer.

References

External links
Profile at STFC

1982 births
Living people
French footballers
French expatriate footballers
Expatriate footballers in England
AS Cannes players
Swindon Town F.C. players
US Pontet Grand Avignon 84 players
Association football midfielders